An Old-Fashioned Girl is a novel by Louisa May Alcott first published in 1869.

The first six chapters of the novel were serialised in the Merry's Museum magazine between July and August 1869. Alcott added another thirteen chapters before publishing the novel. The book revolves around Polly Milton, the old-fashioned girl of the title, who visits the wealthy family of her friend Fanny Shaw in the city and is overwhelmed by their fashionable life they lead and disturbed to see how the family members fail to understand one another and demonstrate little affection. She is largely content to remain on the fringes of their social life but exerts a powerful influence over their emotional lives and family relations.

The novel was the basis of a 1949 musical film starring Gloria Jean as Polly.

Plot introduction 

Polly Milton, a bright 14-year-old country girl, visits her friend Fanny Shaw and her wealthy family in the city for the first time. Poor Polly is overwhelmed by the splendor at the Shaws' and their urbanized, fashionable lifestyles, expensive clothes and other habits she has never been exposed to, and, for the most part, dislikes. Fanny's friends ignore her because of her different behavior and simple clothing, Fanny's brother Tom teases her, and Fan herself can't help considering her unusual sometimes. However, Polly's warmth, support, and kindness eventually win the hearts of all the family members, and her old-fashioned ways teach them a lesson they would never forget.

Over the next six years, Polly visits the Shaws every year and comes to be considered a member of the family. Later, Polly comes back to the city to become a music teacher and struggles with professional issues and internal emotions. Later in the book, Polly finds out that the prosperous Shaws are on the brink of bankruptcy, and she guides them to the realization that wholesome family life is the only thing they will ever need, not money or decoration.

With the comfort of the ever-helpful Polly, the family gets to change for the better and to find a happier life for all of them. After being rejected by his fiancée, Trix, Tom procures a job out West, with Polly's brother Ned, and heads off to help his family and compensate for all the money he has wasted in frivolous expenditures. At that point in the book, we see that Polly and Tom seem to have developed strong feelings for one another.

At the end of the book, Tom returns from the West and finally gets engaged to his true love, Polly.

Characters in "An Old-Fashioned Girl"
~Describe the characters of the novel.~

Major themes
~thematic description, using the work of literary critics (i.e. scholars)~

Literary significance and reception
~description of the work's initial reception and legacy based on the work of literary critics and commentators over 
the years give citations~

References to other works
~description of how this novel mentions other works or their characters~

References to history, geography and current science
~description of how this novel mentions other incidents and subject matter outside 
the world of literature and criticism~

References in other works
~description of works that mention this novel or its characters, if applicable~

Awards and nominations
~lists awards the work received, and significant nominations, if applicable~

Publication history

Adaptations

The novel was the basis of a 1949 musical film starring Gloria Jean as Polly.

References

Sources

 Anonymous review. The Daily Graphic [New York] [September 1875?]. Reprinted in Louisa May Alcott: the contemporary reviews. Ed. by Beverly Lyon Clark. Cambridge: Cambridge University Press, 2004. .
 Anonymous review. The Literary World 6.4 (1 September 1875), 55. Reprinted in Louisa May Alcott: the contemporary reviews. Ed. by Beverly Lyon Clark. Cambridge: Cambridge University Press, 2004. .
 Anonymous review. Taunton Daily Gazette 43.65 (18 September 1875), 2:1. Reprinted in Louisa May Alcott: the contemporary reviews. Ed. by Beverly Lyon Clark. Cambridge: Cambridge University Press, 2004. .
 Lamb, Robert Paul, and Gary Richard Thompson. A Companion to American Fiction, 1865 - 1914. New Jersey: Wiley-Blackwell, 2006. .
 
 Saxton, Martha. Louisa May Alcott: a modern biography. New York: Macmillan, 1994. .

External links

 
 An Old-Fashioned Girl (c1870) at A Celebration of Women Writers
 
 

1869 American novels
American children's novels
American novels adapted into films
Novels first published in serial form
Works originally published in American magazines
Works originally published in children's magazines
1860s children's books
Novels by Louisa May Alcott